The 2014–15 Georgia Tech Yellow Jackets men's basketball team represented the Georgia Institute of Technology during the 2014–15 NCAA Division I men's basketball season. They were led by fourth year head coach Brian Gregory and played their home games at McCamish Pavilion. They were members of the Atlantic Coast Conference. They finished the season 12–19, 3–15 in ACC play to finish in fourteenth place. They lost in the first round of the ACC tournament to Boston College.

Last season
The Yellow Jackets finished the season 16–17, 6–12 in ACC play to finish in a three-way tie for 11th place. They advanced to the second round of the ACC tournament where they lost to Clemson.

Departures

Incoming Transfers

Recruiting

Roster

Schedule

|-
!colspan=9 style="background:#000080; color:#D4AF37;"| Exhibition
|-

|-
!colspan=9 style="background:#000080; color:#D4AF37;"| Non-conference regular season

|-
!colspan=9 style="background:#000080; color:#D4AF37;"| ACC regular season

|-
!colspan=9 style="background:#000080; color:#D4AF37;"| ACC tournament

References

Georgia Tech Yellow Jackets men's basketball seasons
Georgia Tech
Georgia Tech Yellow Jackets men's basketball team
Georgia Tech Yellow Jackets men's basketball team